Boynton is a village and civil parish in the East Riding of Yorkshire, England.

According to the 2001 UK census, the parish had a population of 161, however the 2011 census grouped the parish with Grindale (2001 pop. 98), giving a total of 229.
The parish church of St Andrew's is a Grade I listed building. It includes a 15th-century tower, as well as memorials to the  
Strickland, later Cholmley, later Strickland-Constable Baronets, of Boynton (1641), whose seat was at Boynton Hall, which is also Grade I listed.

From the mediaeval era until the 19th century Boynton was part of Dickering Wapentake. Between 1894 and 1974 Boynton was a part of the Bridlington Rural District, in the East Riding of Yorkshire. Between 1974 and 1996 it was part of the Borough of North Wolds (later Borough of East Yorkshire, in the county of Humberside.

References

External links

Boynton Village community website

Villages in the East Riding of Yorkshire
Civil parishes in the East Riding of Yorkshire